Beatrice Parrocchiale (born 26 December 1995) is an Italian volleyball player, playing as a libero. She is part of the Italy women's national volleyball team.

Career
Parrocchiale won the A2 Italian Cup with Il Bisonte San Casciano.

She competed at the 2015 European Games in Baku.  She participated in the 2015 FIVB Volleyball World Grand Prix. On club level she played for Atletica Amatori Orago in 2015.

She won the 2017 FIVB World Grand Prix silver medal and later played the 2017 European Championship with her national team, reaching the fifth place.

She was selected to play the Italian League All-Star game in 2017.

Awards

Clubs
 2014 Italian Cup A2 –  Champion, with Il Bisonte San Casciano

References

External links
 Italian League Profile
 CEV Profile

1995 births
Living people
Italian women's volleyball players
Sportspeople from Milan
European Games competitors for Italy
Volleyball players at the 2015 European Games
21st-century Italian women